Solariella crossata is a species of sea snail, a marine gastropod mollusk in the family Solariellidae.

Description
The size of the shell attains 2.2 mm.

Distribution
This species occurs in the Atlantic Ocean off Georgia, USA at a depth of 538 m.

References

External links
 To Biodiversity Heritage Library (2 publications)
 To Encyclopedia of Life
 To USNM Invertebrate Zoology Mollusca Collection
 To ITIS
 To World Register of Marine Species

crossata
Gastropods described in 1927